Gennaro Scarlato (born 3 May 1977 in Naples) is an Italian association football manager and former player who played as a defender.

Playing career

International
He was in the provisional squad of Italian U-21 team in 2000 UEFA U-21 Championship and 2000 Olympics, but never made any appearance.

Coaching career
On 19 September 2012, he became the new coach of Marino (head coach) in the Serie D, in place of Nunzio Iardino who had resigned. On 30 October 2012, he was sacked.

References

External links
FIGC 
acspezia.com 

1977 births
Living people
Footballers from Naples
Association football midfielders
Association football defenders
Italian footballers
Italy under-21 international footballers
Italy youth international footballers
S.S.C. Napoli players
L.R. Vicenza players
Torino F.C. players
Udinese Calcio players
Ternana Calcio players
F.C. Crotone players
Spezia Calcio players
Ravenna F.C. players
Frosinone Calcio players
Cosenza Calcio players
Serie A players
Serie B players
S.S. Ischia Isolaverde players
A.S.D. Città di Marino Calcio